The following is a list of episodes in the Transformers series, Transformers: Cybertron.  It chronicles the adventures of the Autobots, as they battle the Decepticons and attempt to claim the four Cyber Planet Keys.

The series uses four pieces of theme music. For the first twenty-seven episodes of the series, "" by Shinji Kakijima is used for the opening theme and "" by Tomoka Issei is used for the ending theme. The remaining episodes use "IGNITION!" by CHINO for the opening theme and "GROWING UP!!" by Shinji Kakijima for the ending theme. In the English dub of the series, all of the original ending themes are removed, with the song "Transformers: Cybertron Theme" by Paul Oakenfold used for both the opening and ending in all episodes.

Episode list

Cybertron
Lists of anime episodes